James W. Kitchens (born April 29, 1943) is a justice of the Supreme Court of Mississippi. He began his eight-year term in January 2009, and was formerly elected the district attorney for the Mississippi counties of Copiah, Lincoln, Pike and Walthall. According to Mississippi Judiciary, Kitchens was "born on April 29, 1943, he graduated from Crystal Springs High School in 1961, then earned a Bachelor of Science degree from the University of Southern Mississippi in 1964, and a Juris Doctor from the University of Mississippi School of Law in 1967."

References

1943 births
Living people
District attorneys in Mississippi
Justices of the Mississippi Supreme Court
University of Southern Mississippi alumni
University of Mississippi School of Law alumni
21st-century American judges